Phalonidia fraterna is a species of moth of the family Tortricidae. It is found in China (Heilongjiang, Henan), Korea and Russia.

The wingspan is 14−16 mm.

References

Moths described in 1970
Phalonidia